KGAM (106.3 FM) is a radio station broadcasting a Spanish adult contemporary format, licensed and operating in Merced, California, USA. It is currently owned by Alfredo Plascencia's Radio Lazer, through the licensee Lazer Licenses, LLC.

History
The station was previously known as the English adult contemporary station "Magic 106.3", and earlier as the country station KNAH "Hank 106.3". Before that, the station was known as KHPO "106.3 The Hippo", which was a classic hits station, and before that KIBG "Big 106.3" which played a hot adult contemporary format, then became adult contemporary.

References

External links

GAM
Mass media in Merced County, California
Merced, California
Radio stations established in 1991
1991 establishments in California